Netflix is a video on demand service which began expanding its business starting in 2010. The platform started in the United States and expanded for the first time in 2010, to Canada.  This marked the beginning of a long expansion process. By 2015, Netflix was operating in 50 countries. Today, Netflix is in over 190 countries, and has drastically increased their rate of expansion in the last five years. As of 2020, there were 203.67 million people paying for a Netflix subscription. Of those people, over 73 million are located in the United States.

Expansion timeline 
In 2010, Netflix entered the international market by expanding into Canada. In 2011, Netflix began to expand more. From September 5 to September 12, 2011, Netflix began rolling out its services to over 40 countries in the Latin America and Caribbean regions. Netflix began its expansion into Europe in 2012.  By the end of that year, Netflix was streaming in the United Kingdom, Ireland, Denmark, Finland, Norway, and Sweden. In 2013, Netflix launched in the Netherlands, and in 2014 Netflix continued its expansion further into Europe. Expansion to Australia and New Zealand occurred in March 2015. On February 4, 2015, expansion to Japan was announced to begin during the fall of 2015. On January 6, 2016 at Consumer Electronics Show, Netflix announced a major international expansion into 130 new territories (including most countries in Africa); with this expansion, the company promoted that its service would now be available nearly "worldwide", with the only notable exclusions including Mainland China, and regions subject to U.S. sanctions, such as Crimea, Syria, and North Korea. The company also announced a partnership with LG to market pre-paid services in Asia, Europe, and the Middle East. As of 2021, Netflix is streaming in over 190 countries, not including China, Crimea, North Korea, or Syria.

2010: Canada 
Netflix entered the international market when they began offering their streaming service to Canada on September 22, 2010. At the time the subscription costed $7.99 a month, a rate that CEO Reed Hastings called, "the lowest, most aggressive price we've ever had anywhere in the world." However, despite the proclaimed low price, content selection in Canada was extremely limited. Data conducted in 2012 by Josh Loewen for Canadian Business Online found that in the United States there were 10,625 unique titles in Netflix's library, whereas in Canada there were only 2,647.  However, there is also content offered exclusively in Canada that is not available in the United States. For example, a short-lived Fox sitcom, Running Wilde starring Keri Russell and Will Arnett, began streaming on Canadian Netflix the same day it began airing in the United States on network television. The show streamed on Canadian Netflix because there was no Canadian broadcast partner for the series. Regardless of streaming selection, it took the company less than a year to reach one million subscribers, approximately three percent of Canada's population. As of February 2014, there were approximately 5.8 million Canadians using Netflix, or 29% of Canada's English-speaking population. This number represents an increase in Canadian users by approximately 40% since 2012.

2011: Latin America, Central America and Caribbean 
On July 5, 2011, Netflix announced its plans to launch streaming service in Latin America, its largest expansion to date. At the time, Netflix had 23 million subscribers in the US and Canada.  Entering the Latin American market meant Netflix had access to approximately 600 million people, or twice the number of people living in the United States. Although high speed internet in Latin America is not as accessible as it in the United States and Canada, upon the announcement of its expansion to Latin America, Netflix stock immediately surged 8%, bringing the company to a record share price of $291.

Beginning in September 2011, the company began its expansion to 43 countries and territories in Latin America and the Caribbean, offering content in English, Spanish, and Portuguese. Brazil became the first country in Latin America to launch the service on September 5. There the service was offered at $BR14.99 or approximately $9.10 per month, making it more expensive than in the United States and Canada. Rounding out the first five countries to launch streaming service in Latin America were Argentina, which followed on the 7th, Chile on the 8th, Colombia on the 9th, and Mexico on the 12th. Service spread to the other 38 countries in the following weeks. Among the content distributed to Latin America was programming from CBS, Miramax, and Showtime.

The launch in Latin America was not as successful as the company had hoped. While in Latin America, Netflix had no streaming competitors as it did in Canada, the digital divide (a lack of high broadband internet penetration) hindered rapid growth. Furthermore, the lack of competitors in some ways slowed growth as well. Whereas in Canada new subscribers had been exposed to streaming content by other companies, the concept was newer to a wide Latin American audience, making some skeptical of the prospect. A banking system unused to recurrent monthly transactions exacerbated the problem. Still, while Latin American expansion happened more slowly than expected, Netflix didn't lose money for the expansion and their Canadian expansion happened at a faster rate than expected, making their first two forays into the international market fairly successful. Additionally, despite the hindrances to growth in Latin America, Netflix continued in pursuit of content expansion, signing a deal with Fox in May 2012 (for a July 15 start) to make its popular content (e.g., How I Met Your Mother, Glee, Bones, The X-Files, Wall Street) available in the region.

The 2011 controversy 
The initial launches in Canada and in Latin America happened before Netflix's 2011 controversy in the United States. In September of that year, the company decided to switch to two separate plans and websites, one for streaming and one for DVD, and hiked their prices accordingly. The change to its business model was accompanied by a loss of approximately one million American users and a plunging stock price. Prior to announcing the change to service stock was valued at just around $300. After the price it plunged to less than $53 a share. Prior to this debacle, Netflix had been having its most successful quarter, mainly due to the decision to expand to Latin America. The company quickly lost all the money it made in the quarter it announced growth to Latin America, was forced to apologize, and rethink its changing model.

Bringing people back to Netflix after this came in two forms. First, it began work on producing its own original content –  announcing its adaptation of House of Cards in 2011 for a 2013 air date and its revival of Arrested Development in 2012 for a 2013 air date. Second, it continued international expansion – the originals were able to travel alongside its international expansion since Netflix, for the most part, retained complete control of their shows' distribution rights.

2012: First European expansion: United Kingdom, Ireland and Scandinavia 
Netflix started its expansion to Europe in 2012, launching in the United Kingdom and Ireland on January 4. By October 18 it had expanded to Denmark, Finland, Norway and Sweden.

According to Christof Baron, CEO of the international marketing group Mindshare, Netflix developed a strategy for its international expansion, "They start with a limited offer which doesn't cost them very much money and minimizes the risk. Then they collect very detailed data about what people like, and structure programming and investment around consumer behavior." This accounts for cultural taste differences and allows distribution deals to develop accordingly. By September 2013, Netflix had added token minimal content from Channel 4, ITV and the BBC, many of which are early series, with subsequents never made available on Netflix.

Netflix UK and Ireland reached its millionth subscriber faster than Netflix Canada, nabbing its millionth member by July 2012. In the UK, BARB (Broadcasters Audience Research Board) reported Netflix as being extremely successful in the UK market. More than one in ten households in the country subscribed to the service by 2014. More than twice as many people subscribed to Netflix than to Amazon Prime. As of the fall of 2014, Netflix had three million UK subscribers which was more twice as many as it had in 2013. Netflix is estimated to have over 300,000 subscribers in Ireland as of 2016.

2013: Netherlands 
Following the United Kingdom and Scandinavia, the next country in Europe to receive Netflix service was The Netherlands, on September 11, 2013. The Netherlands was the only country that Netflix expanded to in 2013, though, as the company decided to slow expansion to control subscription costs. The company spent $3 billion on subscription content that year. Kelly Merryman, the company's Vice President of Content Acquisition, revealed that shows that performed well on BitTorrent networks and other pirate sites were more likely to be offered as part of the expansion. Netflix's CEO further explained that illegal downloading helps to create demand, as users may switch to legal services for an improved user experience.

In the final quarter of 2013, Netflix gained more new subscribers from its pool of countries than it did from the United States for the first time since it began its European expansion, making international expansion increasingly important. As media analyst Anthony Wible has been quoted as saying, "There are only so many people in the United States. The rest of the world is far bigger and the addition of domestic subscribers will start to slow down at some point." At the end of 2013, the company had reached approximately 32 million users in the United States and had additionally had approximately 10 million users internationally.

2014: Further European and India expansion 
By September 19, 2014, the service was also available in Austria, Belgium, France, Germany, Luxembourg, Switzerland and India. While reception throughout the rest of Europe and India was relatively warm, it was fairly hostile in France because of fears that the launch of Netflix would begin to ruin the country's "cultural exception" – its focus on culturally specific media. This led to Netflix's decision to create a series called Marseille, essentially a remake of its hit series House of Cards within a French context and one of the company's first non-English language shows.

Prior to its international expansion in 2010, Netflix's subscriber base grew on average by 2.4 million people a year. Following its arrival in Canada, Latin America, and eventually Europe, its subscriber base has grown on average by 7 million people a year, making international expansion key to Netflix's continued growth in the global marketplace. Notably, the company has over 20 original shows planned for release in 2015 and 2016. In that bunch are Netflix's first non-English language series.

In 2013, Forbes magazine estimated that international streaming accounted for 15% of the company's value. Netflix has subscribed approximately 30% of households in the United States. If able to replicate that in the United Kingdom and Scandinavia alone the company would add 12 million users.

2015: Cuba 
Netflix announced they would expand their business into Cuba in 2015, making them one of the first American companies to do so. However, this expansion brought numerous complications. The limited capacity of Cuba's internet speeds made it difficult to actually watch Netflix in the country. In addition, Netflix's mode required for payment was a barrier to those living in Cuba. Netflix only accepts credit card payments, which are not legal in Cuba. There are also accessibility issues in regards to Netflix's pricing compared to the living wage of those in the country. Therefore, even though Netflix technically expanded to Cuba, the streaming platform is not readily available to the Cuban people.

Third European expansion: Italy, Portugal and Spain 
On June 6, 2015, Reed Hastings announced, in an interview with the Portuguese newspaper Expresso, that Netflix would enter the Italian, Portuguese, and Spanish markets in October, and that it would install its Southern Europe support center (which will cover the previous three markets plus France) in Lisbon, Portugal.

2015–present: Australia 
Netflix expanded into Australia in 2015. As of 2020, 12.2 million people have access to a Netflix subscription in Australia. In the time Netflix has been streaming in Australia, their popularity has grown immensely; the country has the second-highest penetration rate (The of a percentage countries population that subscribes to Netflix's platform)  for Netflix behind Canada, where Netflix has been streaming for 5 years longer.

Netflix has struggled with streaming local Australian content. Local content has made up, at most, 2.5% of the content offered by Netflix since 2017. As of 2019, the percentage of local content has been as low as 1.7%. Ironically, the United States' Netflix catalogue has more Australian content than the Australian catalogue does. Further, the Netflix-produced Australian originals have faced criticism, especially when compared to the content produced by the Australian streaming service Stan. Whereas Stan's originals have had almost all positive reception, Netflix's have missed the mark. For instance, Netflix released Tidelands, a supernatural-thriller original, to Australia in 2018. The show was criticized by an Australian TV critic, Wenlei Ma, as "Not the show Australia deserves to represent us on the US streaming service." Other Netflix Australian originals include Pine Gap and Lunatics, which have both received negative reviews as well.

2017-2022: People's Republic of China deal 
During the CES 2016 announcement, Hastings stated that any potential expansion into the People's Republic of China could take "many years", owing to the tightly regulated state of the internet and media industries in the country. While the company admitted that some of its original productions (such as Crouching Tiger, Hidden Dragon: Sword of Destiny) were meant to appeal to a potential Chinese audience, Hastings stated that the company was in the process of building relationships with local partners that it could form a joint venture with. Rights to House of Cards had previously been sold to Sohu, where it was a modest success, but was pulled by regulators.

On April 25, 2017, Netflix announced that it had reached a licensing deal with the Baidu-owned streaming service iQiyi, although specifics of the deal were not announced, some Netflix original productions will be available on iQiyi day-and-date with their premiere elsewhere.

2022–present: Russian invasion of Ukraine 
Netflix is no longer serving customers in Russia amid the invasion of Ukraine ordered by Vladimir Putin.

The streaming service shut down service entirely in the country, they confirmed on Sunday March 6.

"Given the circumstances on the ground, we have decided to suspend our service in Russia," a spokesperson said, via Variety.

Netflix previously announced that it would pause all future projects and acquisitions from Russia, joining many countries who have similarly cut ties with the country due to the invasion of Ukraine.

Political controversy 

Netflix has encountered political controversy for some of its international productions, including The Mechanism, Fauda and Amo.

An episode of the series Patriot Act with Hasan Minhaj criticizing the Saudi Arabia government was initially available on Netflix within Saudi Arabia but was later made unavailable in the country after a legal complaint from the government. In February 2020 the company released its first report of when it has complied with government requested content takedowns in their countries, a total of 9 times since its launch.:
 In Singapore, Netflix complied with a request to take down The Last Temptation of Christ in 2019, The Last Hangover in 2020, and Cooking on High, The Legend of 420, and Disjointed in 2018.
 In Germany,  Netflix complied with a request to take down a 1990 remake of Night of the Living Dead in 2017.
 In Vietnam,  Netflix complied with a request to take down Full Metal Jacket in 2017.
 In New Zealand, Netflix complied with a request to take down the film The Bridge in 2015. (The report does not confirm which film by this name is the one taken down.)
 In Saudi Arabia, Netflix complied with a request to take down the episode "Saudi Arabia" from the series Patriot Act with Hasan Minhaj in 2019.

References

Netflix
International business